Ahmadabad-e Leyqoli (also Romanized as Aḩmadābād-e Leyqolī and Aḩmadābād Leyqolī; also known as Aḩmadābād-e Soflá, Aḩmadābād, Akhmetabad, Leqlī, Ligli, and Lygly) is a village in Bedevostan-e Gharbi Rural District, Khvajeh District, Heris County, East Azerbaijan Province, Iran. At the 2006 census, its population was 62, in 18 families.

References 

Populated places in Heris County